The Glorieta de Bilbao is a star-shaped roundabout located in Madrid, Spain; named after the city of Bilbao.

Location
The roundabout is famous for being a cross of famous streets: Calle de Fuencarral (one of the most famous shopping streets in Madrid), Carranza, Luchana and Sagasta. Glorieta de Bilbao is also between two of the most historical districts of Madrid: Centro (1) and Chamberí (7). History of the Glorieta is totally linked with the construction of Chamberí district in the 19th century, when it was one of the most important meeting points for the madrileños.

Places of interest
It is an important place in the Madrid's nightlife, close to Malasaña and Tribunal areas. 

One of the most historical cafes of Madrid, the Café Comercial, is located in the number 7 of the Glorieta. The most notable building of Glorieta de Bilbao is Ocaso Building.

Transport
Its metro station is called Bilbao and is served by Line 1 and Line 4.

Roundabouts and traffic circles
Bilbao